This is a list of 156 species in the genus Nematus, willow sawflies.

Nematus species

 Nematus abbotii (Kirby, 1882) b
 Nematus absconditus (Lindqvist, 1949) g
 Nematus acuminalis Vikberg, 1982 g
 Nematus alberich Benson, 1934 g
 Nematus amaurus Vikberg, 1982 g
 Nematus angustiserra (Lindqvist, 1969) g
 Nematus appalachia Smith, 2004 b
 Nematus asper (Lindqvist, 1959) g
 Nematus aurantiacus Hartig, 1837 g
 Nematus bergamnni Dahlbom, 1835 g
 Nematus bergmanni Dahlbom, 1835 g
 Nematus bibartitus Serville, 1823 g
 Nematus bipartitus Serville, 1823 g
 Nematus bohemani Thomson, 1871 g
 Nematus boreophilus (Lindqvist, 1971) g
 Nematus breviseta (Lindqvist, 1949) g
 Nematus brevivalvis Thomson, 1871 g
 Nematus brunneus (Lindqvist, 1971) g
 Nematus cadderensis Cameron, 1875 g
 Nematus caeruleocarpus Hartig, 1837 g
 Nematus calais  b
 Nematus capito (Konow, 1903) g
 Nematus carelicus Hellén, 1948 g
 Nematus caudalis (Lindqvist, 1968) g
 Nematus clavicercus (Lindqvist, 1958) g
 Nematus coeruleus Zinovjev, 1978 g
 Nematus connectus (Lindqvist, 1957) g
 Nematus crassus (Fallén, 1808) g
 Nematus curticornis (Lindqvist, 1969) g
 Nematus dispar Zaddach, 1876 g
 Nematus disparoides (Lindqvist, 1969) g
 Nematus dissimilis Foerster, 1854 g
 Nematus doebelii (Konow, 1904) g
 Nematus dorsatus Cameron, 1876 g
 Nematus epimeris (Lindqvist, 1969) g
 Nematus facialis (Lindqvist, 1969) g
 Nematus fagi Zaddach, 1876 g
 Nematus fahraei Thomson, 1863 g
 Nematus ferrugineus Foerster, 1854 g
 Nematus flavescens Stephens, 1835 g
 Nematus flavominutissimus Haris, 2001 g
 Nematus frenalis Thomson, 1888 g
 Nematus fulvescens (Lindqvist, 1949) g
 Nematus fulviventris (Lindqvist, 1957) g
 Nematus fumosus Lacourt, 1991 g
 Nematus fuscomaculatus Foerster, 1854 g
 Nematus fusculus (Lindqvist, 1957) g
 Nematus glaphyropus Dalla Torre, 1882 g
 Nematus gracilidentatus (Viitasaari, 1980) g
 Nematus holmgreni (Lindqvist, 1968) g
 Nematus hypoxanthus Foerster, 1854 g
 Nematus incompletus Foerster, 1854 g
 Nematus iridescens  b
 Nematus jugicola Thomson g
 Nematus kangasi (Lindqvist, 1964) g
 Nematus latibasis (Lindqvist, 1949) g
 Nematus lauroi (Lindqvist, 1960) g
 Nematus leachii Dahlbom, 1835 g
 Nematus leionotus (Benson, 1933) g
 Nematus leptocephalus Thomson, 1862 g
 Nematus leptostigma (Lindqvist, 1957) g
 Nematus leucopyga (Lindqvist, 1949) g
 Nematus leucotrochus Hartig, 1837 g
 Nematus lientericus Holmgren, 1883 g
 Nematus lindbergi (Lindqvist, 1957) g
 Nematus lipovskyi  b  (azalea sawfly)
 Nematus longispinis Kriechbaumer, 1885 g
 Nematus lonicerae (Weiffenbach, 1957) g
 Nematus lucens (Enslin, 1918) g
 Nematus lucidus Panzer, 1801 g
 Nematus maculifrons (Lindqvist, 1960) g
 Nematus majusculus Lacourt, 1991 g
 Nematus melanaspis Hartig, 1840 g
 Nematus melanocephalus Hartig, 1837 g
 Nematus melanochrous (Lindqvist, 1969) g
 Nematus microserratus (Lindqvist, 1941) g
 Nematus miliaris (Panzer, 1797) g
 Nematus mimus (Konow, 1903) g
 Nematus monticola Thomson, 1871 g
 Nematus mucronatus Hartig, 1837 g
 Nematus myosotidis (Fabricius, 1804) g
 Nematus nigirtus (Lindqvist, 1957) g
 Nematus nigricornis Serville, 1823 g
 Nematus nigritus (Lindqvist, 1957) g
 Nematus nigriventris Holmgren, 1883 g
 Nematus nigrtus (Lindqvist, 1957) g
 Nematus nitidus (Lindqvist, 1969) g
 Nematus notabilis (Konow, 1903) g
 Nematus nubium (Benson, 1935) g
 Nematus nuortevai (Lindqvist, 1957) g
 Nematus olfaciens Benson, 1953 g
 Nematus oligospilus Foerster, 1854 g b
 Nematus ostryae  b
 Nematus pallens (Konow, 1903) g
 Nematus pallidinervis (Hellén, 1951) g
 Nematus palliditarsis Vameron, 1875 g
 Nematus papillosus (Retzius, 1783) g
 Nematus parviserratus (Lindqvist, 1944) g
 Nematus parvulus Holmgren, 1883 g
 Nematus pavidus Serville, 1823 g
 Nematus peltoneni (Lindqvist, 1969) g
 Nematus platystigma (Lindqvist, 1949) g
 Nematus pleurosticta (Förster, 1854) g
 Nematus poecilonotus Zaddach, 1876 g
 Nematus polaris Holmgren, 1883 g
 Nematus politus (Lindqvis, 1974) g
 Nematus pravus (Konow, 1895) g
 Nematus princeps Zaddach, 1876 g
 Nematus pseudodispar (Lindqvist, 1969) g
 Nematus putoni (Konow, 1903) g
 Nematus quietus Eversmann, 1847 g
 Nematus renei (Lindqvist, 1957) g
 Nematus respondens Foerster, 1854 g
 Nematus reticulatus Holmgren, 1883 g
 Nematus ribesicola (Lindqvist, 1949) g
 Nematus ribesii (Scopoli) i c g b  (imported currantworm)
 Nematus rutilipes (Lindqvist, 1959) g
 Nematus salicis (Linnaeus, 1758) g
 Nematus scotonotus Foerster, 1854 g
 Nematus semiopacus (Lindqvist, 1957) g
 Nematus semipunctatus (Lindqvist, 1957) g
 Nematus seriepunctatus (Malaise, 1921) g
 Nematus similator Foerster, 1854 g
 Nematus sordiapex (Lindqvist, 1959) g
 Nematus sordidiapex (Lindqvist, 1959) g
 Nematus spiraeae Zaddach, 1883 g
 Nematus stichi (Enslin, 1913) g
 Nematus stramineipes (Lindqvist, 1957) g
 Nematus striatipleuris (Lindqvist, 1957) g
 Nematus subflavus (Lindqvist, 1957) g
 Nematus sylvestris Cameron, 1884 g
 Nematus tataricus Zinovjev, 1978 g
 Nematus tegularis (Lindqvist, 1969) g
 Nematus tenuitarsis (Konow, 1901) g
 Nematus thunebergi (Lindqvist, 1959) g
 Nematus tibialis Newman, 1837 g b  (locust sawfly)
 Nematus togatus Zaddach, 1876 g
 Nematus torneensis (Malaise, 1920) g
 Nematus trisignatus Förster, 1854 g
 Nematus truncus Vikberg, 1982 g
 Nematus tulunensis Vikberg, 1972 g
 Nematus umbratus Thomson, 1871 g
 Nematus vaccinii (Lindqvist, 1964) g
 Nematus variegatus (Lindqvist, 1957) g
 Nematus vastatrix (Zhelochovtsev, 1935) g
 Nematus ventralis Say i c g b  (willow sawfly)
 Nematus verticalis (Lindqvist, 1957) g
 Nematus vicinus Serville, 1823 g
 Nematus villosus Thomson, 1862 g
 Nematus viridis Stephens, 1835 g
 Nematus viridissimus Möller, 1882 g
 Nematus wahlbergi Thomson, 1871 g
 Nematus wolteri (Lindqvist, 1957) g
 Nematus woollatti (Lindqvist, 1971) g
 Nematus xanthogaster Förster, 1854 g
 Nematus zaddachi (Enslin, 1916) g

Data sources: i = ITIS, c = Catalogue of Life, g = GBIF, b = Bugguide.net

References

Nematus